The Berryville Agriculture Building is a historic school building, located in a large school complex on the west side of Berryville, Arkansas.  It is an L-shaped stone Plain Traditional structure, built in 1940 pursuant to the terms of the Smith–Hughes Act providing for a vocational agricultural teaching environment.  The main facade faces east, with the entrance off-center to the north, sheltered by a gabled porch hood.  A single window is located on the wall further south.

The building was listed on the National Register of Historic Places in 1992.

See also
National Register of Historic Places listings in Carroll County, Arkansas

References

School buildings on the National Register of Historic Places in Arkansas
Buildings and structures in Berryville, Arkansas
National Register of Historic Places in Carroll County, Arkansas
1940 establishments in Arkansas
School buildings completed in 1940